Johnny Gregorek Jr. is an American middle distance runner. He competed in the 2017 World Championships in the 1500, where he placed 10th in a time of 3:37.56. As of May 2020, Gregorek holds the world record for the fastest Blue Jean Mile, ran in a time of 4:06.25.

Running Career
Gregorek was raised in Seekonk, Massachusetts, where he helped Seekonk High School win the state cross country title. He earned a degree from Columbia University in 2014, then, taking advantage of an NCAA rule which allows athletes to transfer to another school for a fifth year of competition, joined the Oregon Ducks.

Gregorek finished in 6th place at the 2016 US Olympic Trials. In 2017, he qualified for the World Championships in London for 1500m, where he finished 10th, following his 3rd place finish at the US Championships. In 2019, he ran 3:49.98 for 1 mile at Boston University, making his time second on the All-Time American Indoor Mile list. He and his father share the record for the fastest father-son mile duo in world history.

Personal Bests

Blue Jeans Mile 
On May 30, 2020, Gregorek ran what is believed to be the fastest mile ever run by someone wearing blue jeans in 4 minutes and 6.25 seconds, beating the previous world record by five seconds. Gregorek ran the Blue Jean Mile wearing 100% cotton Levi’s, while raising over $37,500 for the National Alliance on Mental Illness (NAMI). He ran the mile in memory of his younger brother Patrick, who died suddenly in March 2019 after struggling with mental health.

Personal 
Gregorek's father John Gregorek competed in steeplechase for the 1980 and 1984 Olympic teams. His mother, Christine Mullen, was an Olympic trials finalist and competed in the 1980s for Athletics West in Eugene, Oregon.

In January 2019, Gregorek married Amy Nunes.

Notes

External links

1991 births
American male middle-distance runners
Living people
World Athletics Championships athletes for the United States
Columbia Lions men's track and field athletes
People from Seekonk, Massachusetts
Athletes (track and field) at the 2019 Pan American Games
Pan American Games silver medalists for the United States
Pan American Games medalists in athletics (track and field)
Pan American Games track and field athletes for the United States
Medalists at the 2019 Pan American Games